Luke Ivanovic (born 6 June 2000) is an Australian professional footballer who plays as a striker for Perth Glory.

Club career

Junior football
Ivanovic started playing football with the Football NSW Institute and APIA Leichhardt.

Bonnyrigg White Eagles
In March 2017, at the age of 16, Ivanovic made his senior debut for Bonnyrigg White Eagles in the opening game of the 2017 NPL NSW Men's 1 season against Sydney Olympic.

Sydney FC
Ivanovic joined A-League club Sydney FC in 2018. In January 2019, following a couple of senior appearances from the bench and based on his Y-League form, the club signed Ivanovic to a senior contract until the end of the 2018–19 A-League season. The following month he made his starting debut against Melbourne City, scoring his first goal for the club. At the end of the season he signed a one-year contract extension until the end of the 2019–20 A-League season. In December 2019, he signed a contract extension with the club, until the end of the 2021–22 A-League season. In July 2021, with one year left remaining on his contract, Sydney FC allowed Ivanovic to leave to allow him to receive more regular game time.

Brisbane Roar
A few weeks after leaving Sydney FC, Ivanovic signed with Brisbane Roar on a multi-year contract.

Personal life
Ivanovic was born to two Serbian parents and grew up in Picton, south-west of Sydney.

Career statistics

Honours

Club
Sydney FC
 A-League Championship: 2019–20
 A-League Premiership: 2019–20

References

External links

2000 births
Living people
Australian soccer players
Association football forwards
Sydney FC players
Brisbane Roar FC players
Perth Glory FC players
National Premier Leagues players
A-League Men players
Bonnyrigg White Eagles FC players
Australian people of Serbian descent